Clas Åkesson Tott (c. 1530–1596) was a military Field Marshal (1572) and member of the Privy Council of Sweden (1575).

In the Russo-Swedish War (1554–1557), he was the rittmeister of the cavalry squadron Upplandsfanan. He became responsible for the enlistment of army personnel in Finland, in 1563. At the Battle of Axtorna, in 1566, he was taken as prisoner of war, but he was released in 1569. As the commander-in-chief of Estonia (1572–1574), he defeated the Russians at the Battle of Lode in 1573, before he was displaced by Pontus de la Gardie due to the disastrous outcome of the Siege of Wesenberg (1574).

He became the stadtholder of Finland in 1576, but he fell out of grace with John III which led to his losing his titles in 1589 and his membership in the Privy Council.

Sources
Notes

General reference
The article Tott, Clas Åkesson in Nationalencyklopedin (1995).
The article Tott, Clas Åkesson in Biografiskt lexikon för Finland (2008).

Tott Akesson, Clas
Tott Akesson, Clas
Tott Akesson, Clas
Tott Akesson, Clas
16th-century Swedish politicians
16th-century Swedish military personnel